"Les Poissons" (in French "les poissons" simply means "the fishes") is a song from the 1989 film The Little Mermaid, which is sung in the film and in The Little Mermaid Broadway show by the character Chef Louis. Chef Louis is voiced by René Auberjonois in the film, and by John Treacy Egan in the Broadway show. The song was composed by Alan Menken with lyrics by Howard Ashman.

Sebastian the crab (voiced by Samuel E. Wright) is trapped in a kitchen with Chef Louis who sings the song while preparing a seafood dinner for the newly human Ariel and Prince Eric. The song is on the Classic Disney Vol. 3: 60 Years of Musical Magic CD.

External links

Lyrics from StLyrics.com

Songs about fish
Macaronic songs
Disney Renaissance songs
Songs from The Little Mermaid (franchise)
1989 songs
Songs with music by Alan Menken
Songs with lyrics by Howard Ashman
Song recordings produced by Alan Menken
Song recordings produced by Howard Ashman